Ilse Fusková Kornreich (Buenos Aires, 11 June 1929) is an Argentine activist, lesbian-feminist, and journalist.

Fuskova was the first woman who came out and openly declared that she was a lesbian on Argentine television. This occurred in 1991, when TV host Mirtha Legrand invited Fuskova to participate in one of her televised lunches. It was said to be the most watched show of the year. Fuskova was married; she has three children.

In 1984, she separated and in the following year, began a lesbian-feminist movement. She was co-editor of Cuadernos de Existencia Lesbiana (Journal of the Lesbian Existence) with Adriana Carrasco, the first issue released 8 March 1987. In the 1990s, she joined Gays por los Derechos Civiles (Gays for Civil Rights) with Carlos Jáuregui. She was instrumental in the organizing lesbian, gay and the first trans activists to develop the first Marcha del Orgullo LGBT de Buenos Aires (Lesbian-Gay Pride Parade), June 1992. For 20 years, she was in a relationship with Claudina Marek, who is also active in lesbian activism. Together, they published in 1994, a conversation with Silvia Schmid, the book Amor de mujeres. El lesbianismo en la Argentina, hoy (Love of women. Lesbianism in Argentina, today). " Fuskova was honored at the "Primer Encuentro Nacional de Mujeres Lesbianas y Bisexuales de Rosario" (First National Women's Lesbian and Bisexual of Rosario) in 2008.

In recent years, she also focuses on environmentalism and is in a relationship with a gay man. In 2015, she was declared Citizen of the City of Buenos Aires by the Buenos Aires Legislature.

Selected works
 Amor de mujeres : el lesbianismo en la Argentina, hoy (with Claudina Marek, 1994)

References

Bibliography

1929 births
Argentine feminists
Argentine human rights activists
Argentine non-fiction writers
Argentine people of Russian descent
Argentine women journalists
Argentine women writers
Lesbian feminists
Argentine lesbian writers
Argentine LGBT rights activists
Living people
People from Buenos Aires
Women civil rights activists